Lloyd Daniël van Dams (5 March 1972 – 29 December 2021), also known as The Tornado, was a Surinamese-born Dutch heavyweight kickboxer. He was a Dutch, European, and World Muay Thai champion. Known for his durability, van Dams was never knocked out in 84 professional fights (though he was defeated once via TKO from exhaustion). He held notable wins over Remy Bonjasky, Brian Douwes, Alexander Ustinov, Bjorn Bregy, and Brecht Wallis. Van Dams also competed in mixed martial arts.

Life and career 
Van Dams was born in Suriname on 5 March 1972, and moved to the Netherlands when he was seven years old. He began training kickboxing when he was 12 at SWSU, a Surinamese-Dutch gym in Utrecht. When he was good enough, his trainer decided to take him to Chakuriki. Van Dams had his first professional fight at the age of 18.

When he was 20 he moved from Utrecht to Dordrecht and began training with Jan Vleesenbeek. This trainer was known for his hard training methods, which suited van Dams very well. When Vleesenbeek decided to stop training, van Dams moved to a gym called "Survivor" in Breda.

When facing problems in his personal life in 1996, van Dams moved back to Utrecht. He went training at Chakuriki Gym in Amsterdam, under Thom Harinck and developed himself as one of the top fighters of the gym.

In 1999, he made his K-1 debut at the K-1 Braves '99. After beating Matt Skelton in the semi-finals he lost to Xhavit Bajrami at the finals. After a few years, van Dams made his comeback in 2005. First he fought at an 8-man tourney "Fight at the Border" in Belgium, where he lost on his comeback to Petar Majstorovic by unanimous decision. A week later he won a 4-man tournament in Romania. He defeated Pavel Majer and Alben Belinski.

In 2006 Lloyd opened his own gym, Fight Club Van Dams in Utrecht, Netherlands. He died from heart disease on 29 December 2021, at the age of 49.

Titles 
2010 Amsterdam Fight Club 4 man tournament champion
2004 King Of The Ring World GP tournament champion
2001 K-1 World Grand Prix in Fukuoka Repechage A Runner Up
2000 WFCA World champion
1999 WMTA World champion
1998 EMTA European champion
1998 KO-Power Tournament champion
1997 Battle of the Best tournament champion
1996 NKBB Dutch champion

Kickboxing record

|-  bgcolor="#CCFFCC"
| 2010-02-27 || Win ||align=left| Benjey Zimmerman || Amsterdam Fightclub: Rotterdam vs Amsterdam || Amsterdam, Netherlands || Decision (Unanimous) || 3 || 3:00
|-
! style=background:white colspan=9 |
|-
|-  bgcolor="#CCFFCC"
| 2010-02-27 || Win ||align=left| Brian Douwes || Amsterdam Fightclub: Rotterdam vs Amsterdam || Amsterdam, Netherlands || Decision (Unanimous) || 3 || 3:00
|-  bgcolor="#c5d2ea"
| 2009-05-31 || Draw ||align=left| Anderson Silva || Next Generation Warriors 3 || Utrecht, Netherlands || Decision draw || 3 || 3:00
|-  bgcolor="#CCFFCC"
| 2008-12-29 || Win ||align=left| Ron Ritter || The Return of the Boys || Paramaribo, Suriname || KO (Low kicks) || 1 || 
|-  bgcolor="#CCFFCC"
| 2008-11-23 || Win ||align=left| Samir Benazzouz || RingSensation || The Hague, Netherlands || Decision (Unanimous) || 3 || 3:00
|-  bgcolor="#CCFFCC"
| 2007-08-11 || Win ||align=left| Ryuta Noji || Heat4 || Nagoya, Japan || Decision (Unanimous) || 3 || 3:00
|-  bgcolor="#c5d2ea"
| 2006-12-16 || Draw ||align=left| Wisam Feyli || Travelfight Arena || Uppsala, Sweden || Decision draw || 3 || 3:00
|-  bgcolor="#FFBBBB"
| 2006-10-08 || Loss ||align=left| Alexander Ustinov || The Battle of Arnhem V || Arnhem, Netherlands || Decision (Unanimous) || 5 || 3:00
|-
! style=background:white colspan=9 |
|-
|-  bgcolor="#FFBBBB"
| 2006-05-13 || Loss ||align=left| Semmy Schilt || K-1 World Grand Prix 2006 in Amsterdam || Amsterdam, Netherlands || Decision (Unanimous) || 3 || 3:00
|-  bgcolor="#CCFFCC"
| 2006-03-26 || Win ||align=left| Brecht Wallis || Balans Fight Night || Tilburg, Netherlands || Decision (Unanimous) || 3 || 3:00
|-  bgcolor="#CCFFCC" 
| 2005-12-18 || Win ||align=left| Alben Belinski || Local Kombat 18 "Revanşa" Final || Constanta, Romania || Decision (Unanimous) || 3 || 3:00
|-
! style=background:white colspan=9 |
|-
|-  bgcolor="#CCFFCC" 
| 2005-12-18 || Win ||align=left| Pavel Majer || Local Kombat 18 "Revanşa" Semifinal || Constanta, Romania || Decision (Unanimous) || 3 || 3:00
|-  bgcolor="#FFBBBB"
| 2005-12-10 || Loss ||align=left| Petar Majstorovic || Fights at the Border IV, Quarter finals || Lommel, Belgium || Decision (Unanimous) || 3 || 3:00
|-  bgcolor="#CCFFCC" 
| 2005-04-30 || Win ||align=left| Achmed Jattari || Queens Fight Night || Eindhoven, Netherlands ||  ||  ||
|-  bgcolor="#CCFFCC" 
| 2004-12-10 || Win ||align=left| Nenad Nedimovic || Local Kombat 11: Intepeneste Valcea || Râmnicu Vâlcea, Romania || KO || 2 ||
|-  bgcolor="#CCFFCC" 
| 2004-05-29 || Win ||align=left| Jerrel Venetiaan || King of the Ring World GP, Final || Venice, Italy || Decision (Unanimous) || 3 || 3:00
|-
! style=background:white colspan=9 |
|-
|-  bgcolor="#CCFFCC" 
| 2004-05-29 || Win ||align=left| Alexander Ustinov || King of the Ring World GP, Semi final || Venice, Italy || Decision (Split) || 3 || 3:00
|-  bgcolor="#CCFFCC" 
| 2004-05-29 || Win ||align=left| Robert Byceck || King of the Ring World GP, Quarter final || Venice, Italy || KO (Left low kick) || 1 || 1:03
|-  bgcolor="#CCFFCC" 
| 2003-05-31 || Win ||align=left| Ait Daouda || Muay Thai Express 1 || Rotterdam, Netherlands || TKO (Corner stoppage) || 3 ||
|-  bgcolor="#FFBBBB"
| 2002-08-10 || Loss ||align=left| Lechi Kurbanov || 8.10 ICHIGEKI || Tokyo, Japan || Decision (Unanimous) || 3 || 3:00
|-  bgcolor="#CCFFCC" 
| 2002-07-07 || Win ||align=left| Sean Johnson || Bad Boys Day part 1 || Utrecht, Netherlands || TKO (Low kicks) || 1 ||
|-  bgcolor="#FFBBBB"
| 2001-10-08 || Loss ||align=left| Francisco Filho || K-1 World Grand Prix 2001 in Fukuoka || Fukuoka, Japan || Decision (Majority) || 3 || 3:00
|-  bgcolor="#CCFFCC"
| 2001-10-08 || Win ||align=left| Matt Skelton || K-1 World Grand Prix 2001 in Fukuoka || Fukuoka, Japan || Decision (Unanimous) || 3 || 3:00
|-  bgcolor="#FFBBBB"
| 2001-07-20 || Loss ||align=left| Alexey Ignashov || K-1 World Grand Prix 2001 in Nagoya, Final || Nagoya, Japan || Decision (Unanimous) || 3 || 3:00
|-
! style=background:white colspan=9 |
|-
|-  bgcolor="#FFBBBB"
| 2001-07-20 || Loss ||align=left| Mike Bernardo || K-1 World Grand Prix 2001 in Nagoya, Semi final || Nagoya, Japan || Ext. R Decision (Majority) || 4 || 3:00
|-  bgcolor="#CCFFCC"
| 2001-07-20 || Win ||align=left| Bjorn Bregy || K-1 World Grand Prix 2001 in Nagoya, Quarter final || Nagoya, Japan || Decision (Unanimous) || 3 || 3:00
|-  bgcolor="#CCFFCC"
| 2001-04-15 || Win ||align=left| Tooru Oishi || K-1 Burning 2001 || Kumamoto, Japan || Decision (Unanimous) || 5 || 3:00
|-  bgcolor="#FFBBBB"
| 2000-12-12 || Loss ||align=left| Alexey Ignashov || It's Showtime - Christmas Edition || Haarlem, Netherlands || TKO (Exhaustion) || 5 || 3:00 
|-  bgcolor="#CCFFCC" 
| 2000-10-08 || Win ||align=left| Peter Verschuren || Victory or Hell part I || Amsterdam, Netherlands || TKO (Ref stop/Three knockdowns) || 3 || 
|-  bgcolor="#FFBBBB"
| 2000-07-30 || Loss ||align=left| Ernesto Hoost || K-1 World Grand Prix 2000 in Nagoya, Semi final || Nagoya, Japan || Decision (Majority) || 3 || 3:00
|-  bgcolor="#CCFFCC"
| 2000-07-30 || Win ||align=left| Tatsufumi Tomihira || K-1 World Grand Prix 2000 in Nagoya, Quarter final || Nagoya, Japan || KO || 2 || 2:07
|-  bgcolor="#CCFFCC" 
| 2000-04-23 || Win ||align=left| Samir Benazzouz || K-1 The Millennium || Osaka, Japan || Decision (Unanimous) || 3 || 3:00
|-  bgcolor="#CCFFCC" 
| 1999-10-21 || Win ||align=left| Rene Rooze || || Haarlem, Netherlands || Decision (Unanimous) || 3 || 3:00
|-  bgcolor="#FFBBBB"
| 1999-10-05 || Loss ||align=left| Peter Aerts || K-1 World Grand Prix '99 Opening Round || Osaka, Japan || Decision (Unanimous) || 5 || 3:00
|-
! style=background:white colspan=9 |
|-
|-  bgcolor="#FFBBBB"
| 1999-06-20 || Loss ||align=left| Xhavit Bajrami || K-1 Braves '99, Final || Japan || Ext R Decision (Unanimous) || 4 || 3:00
|-
! style=background:white colspan=9 |
|-
|-  bgcolor="#CCFFCC"
| 1999-06-20 || Win ||align=left| Matt Skelton || K-1 Braves '99, Semi final || Japan || Ext R Decision (Unanimous) || 4 || 3:00
|-  bgcolor="#CCFFCC"
| 1999-06-20 || Win ||align=left| Tomasz Kucharzewski || K-1 Braves '99, Quarter final || Japan || KO (Right low kick) || 2 || 1:48
|-  bgcolor="#CCFFCC" 
| 1999-03-27 || Win ||align=left| Bob Schreiber || The Fight of the Gladiators || Amsterdam, Netherlands || Decision (Unanimous) || 5 || 3:00
|-
! style=background:white colspan=9 |
|-
|-  bgcolor="#CCFFCC" 
| 1998-09-26 || Win ||align=left| William van Rosmalen || The Fight of the Champions || Amsterdam, Netherlands || Decision (Unanimous) || 5 || 3:00
|-
! style=background:white colspan=9 |
|-
|-  bgcolor="#CCFFCC" 
| 1998-05-31 || Win ||align=left| Bob Schreiber || Fight of the Decade || Amsterdam, Netherlands || TKO (Corner stoppage) || 4 || 
|-  bgcolor="#CCFFCC" 
| 1998-04-14 || Win ||align=left| Remy Bonjasky || Muay Thai Power tournament, Final || Amsterdam, Netherlands || Decision (Unanimous) || 3 || 3:00
|-
! style=background:white colspan=9 |
|-
|-  bgcolor="#CCFFCC" 
| 1998-04-14 || Win ||align=left| Peter Kramer || Muay Thai Power tournament, Semi final || Amsterdam, Netherlands || Decision (Unanimous) || 3 || 3:00
|-  bgcolor="#CCFFCC" 
| 1998-02-15 || Win ||align=left| Richard Paans || Thai/Kickboxing in Nijmegen || Nijmegen, Netherlands || KO || 1 || 
|-  bgcolor="#ffbbbb" 
| 1997-11-27 || Loss ||align=left| Peter Verschuren || Thaiboxing in Amsterdam || Amsterdam, Netherlands || Decision (Unanimous) || 5 || 3:00
|-  bgcolor="#CCFFCC" 
| 1997-05-11 || Win ||align=left| Pedro Rizzo || Battle of the Best tournament, Final || Den Bosch, Netherlands || TKO (Corner stoppage) || 2 || 
|-
! style=background:white colspan=9 |
|-
|-  bgcolor="#CCFFCC" 
| 1997-05-11 || Win ||align=left| Perry Telgt || Battle of the Best tournament, Semi final || Den Bosch, Netherlands || Decision (Unanimous) || 3 || 3:00
|-  bgcolor="#CCFFCC" 
| 1997-05-11 || Win ||align=left| Peter Verschuren || Battle of the Best tournament, Quarter final || Den Bosch, Netherlands || KO || 1 ||
|-

|-  bgcolor="#ffbbbb"
| 2005-12-31 || Loss ||align=left| Gary Goodridge || Pride Shockwave || Tokyo, Japan || TKO (Punches) || 1 || 3:39 
|-
| colspan=9 | Legend:

See also
List of male kickboxers
List of K-1 events

References

http://www.boutreview.com/fightsspiral/royd_vandam.html

External links
FC Van Dams Official site

1972 births
2021 deaths
Dutch male kickboxers
Surinamese male kickboxers
Dutch male mixed martial artists
Surinamese male mixed martial artists
Heavyweight kickboxers
Dutch Muay Thai practitioners
Surinamese Muay Thai practitioners
Surinamese emigrants to the Netherlands
Mixed martial artists utilizing Muay Thai
Sportspeople from Utrecht (city)
People from Para District
SUPERKOMBAT kickboxers